Red Cliffs Mall is a shopping mall in St. George, Utah, United States that opened in 1990. It is the only major indoor shopping center between Las Vegas, Nevada and the Wasatch Front, located on Red Cliffs Drive, adjacent to Interstate 15.
Managed by Brookfield Properties, the mall features Dillard's, JCPenney, Barnes & Noble and H&M as its anchor stores as well as 60-plus major retailers. Newer tenants as of 2021 include Victoria's Secret, Men's Wearhouse and Tilly's.

History 
The original anchors were JCPenney, ZCMI, and Walmart, with Sears joining in 1998. Dillard's later took over the ZCMI location, and relocated to the former Walmart space after Walmart vacated the mall in 2002 to relocate to a new supercenter. The Megaplex movie theater closed in 2016 after a larger location opened several blocks away.
Barnes & Noble opened in 2008 as a new anchor.
Sears closed in 2017. A large H&M store opened in the fall of 2018.

References

External links

Buildings and structures in St. George, Utah
Brookfield Properties
Shopping malls in Utah
Shopping malls established in 1990
1990 establishments in Utah